Melkøya is an island in Hammerfest Municipality in Troms og Finnmark county, Norway. The  island is connected to the town of Hammerfest (on the neighboring island of Kvaløya to the west) by the Melkøysund Tunnel which was completed in 2003.

The industrial island is the endpoint of the undersea pipeline that transports natural gas from the Snøhvit natural gas fields in the Barents Sea. The plant opened in 2007 and it is operated by Equinor. After a fire closed the plant in 2020, it re-opened in 2022. Liquefied natural gas is then exported from Melkøya to world markets by a LNG gas carrier or tanker.

History
The island was previously used for farming, and rental houses for seasonal fishermen were also built on the island.

In 2001 and 2002, major archaeological investigations on Melkøya were undertaken before Statoil's development of the island began. The development of the island has changed Melkøya completely. On 21 August 2007, the gas from the Snøhvit field began flowing to Melkøya.

The endangered black-legged kittiwake adopted a man-made cliff at the facility for nesting, making it one of the largest kittiwake colonies in the world.

Media gallery

See also
List of islands of Norway

References

Islands of Troms og Finnmark
Hammerfest